Cunkovci is a small village east of Ptuj in northeastern Slovenia. It lies in the Municipality of Gorišnica. The area traditionally belonged to the Styria region and is now included in the Drava Statistical Region.

There is a small chapel-shrine in the settlement. It was built in 1922.

References

External links
Cunkovci on Geopedia

Populated places in the Municipality of Gorišnica